The 1987 All-Ireland Senior Ladies' Football Championship Final was the fifteenth All-Ireland Final and the deciding match of the 1987 All-Ireland Senior Ladies' Football Championship, an inter-county ladies' Gaelic football tournament for the top teams in Ireland.

Kerry led 2–3 to 0–0 after fifteen minutes, but Westmeath showed their mettle to fight back to a one-point gap, but they then ran out of steam.

References

!
All-Ireland Senior Ladies' Football Championship Finals
Kerry county ladies' football team matches
Westmeath county ladies' football team matches
All-Ireland